David P. Hull was a member of the Wisconsin State Assembly.

Biography
Hull was born on August 22, 1817. He graduated from what is now the University of Cincinnati College of Law in 1840 and moved to Milwaukee, Wisconsin in 1851.

Career
Hull was a member of the Assembly during the 1877 session. Previously, he had been a member of the Milwaukee Common Council in 1869 and 1870. He was a Republican.

References

Politicians from Milwaukee
Republican Party members of the Wisconsin State Assembly
Wisconsin city council members
University of Cincinnati College of Law alumni
1817 births
Year of death missing